Double Head Cabbage is a village in Belize located in Belize District.

References

Populated places in Belize District
Belize Rural North